Wilhelm Jerusalem (11 October 1854 in Dřenice – 15 July 1923 in Vienna) was an Austrian Jewish philosopher and pedagogue.

Biography
Jerusalem studied classical philosophy at the University of Prague and prepared a doctorate entitled  "The Inscription of Sestos and Polybios". Until 1887 he was a teacher at grammar schools in Prague and Nikolsburg. In 1888 he became a member of the staff of teachers at the grammar school "k.k. Staatsgymnasium im VIII.Bezirk" (Bundesgymnasium Wien 8) in Vienna. In 1891 he was an outside lecturer at the University of Vienna. One of his interests was education, and he demanded a change of the educational system in the Austro-Hungarian monarchy. Another of his fields of interest was the education of minorities. He wrote a monograph about the education of the deafblind. In 1890 he published a psychological study about the deafblind Laura Bridgman. 

He is regarded as the discoverer of the literary talent of the deaf-blind writer Helen Keller and corresponded with her. They never met personally. From scientific work about the deafblind he developed the Austrian direction of the philosophical method of "Pragmatism". In 1907 he translated William James's "Pragmatism" into German.  After World War I he became an associate professor of philosophy and educational theory at the University of Vienna . In 1919 he became one of the teachers of the "Schönbrunner Schule" (Schönbrunn School) which came about after the Vice Mayor of Vienna Max Winter had obtained a considerable part of the Viennese Schönbrunn Palace to be used for the advancement of the education of young women, and a small number of men, to become educators and teachers.

In 1923, Jerusalem became a Professor of the University of Vienna. He died of a heart attack on 15 July 1923, in Vienna.

Among his students were the writer Stephan Hock, the politician Karl Renner, the composer Viktor Ullmann, the poet Anton Wildgans, the philosopher Vladimir Dvorniković and Otto Felix Kanitz.

Works 
 Laura Bridgman, Erziehung einer Taubblinden, Vienna 1890
 Die Urtheilsfunction, Vienna-Leipzig 1895
 Kants Bedeutung für die Gegenwart, Vienna-Leipzig 1904
 Wege und Ziele der Ästhetik, Vienna 1906
 Der Pragmatismus, Vorwort zur Übersetzung des Werkes von William James, Leipzig 1907
 Die Aufgaben des Lehrers an Höheren Schulen, Vienna-Leipzig 1912
 Der Krieg im Lichte der Gesellschaftslehre, Stuttgart 1915
 "Zu dem Menschen redet eben die Geschichte", in Friedenspflichten des Einzelnen, Gotha 1917
 "Moralische Richtlinien nach dem Kriege. Ein Beitrag zur soziologischen Ethik, Vienna 1918
 Einleitung in die Philosophie,  siebte bis zehnte Auflage, Vienna 1919-1923
 "Meine Wege und Ziele", in Die Philosophie der Gegenwart in Selbstdarstellungen, vol. III, ed. Raymond Schmidt, Leipzig 1992
 Einführung in die Soziologie, Vienna-Leipzig 1926

References

Further reading 
 Vladimir I. Lenin "Materialism and Empirio-Criticism" 1908-1909
 Bertrand Russell "Pragmatism" 1909
 Max Adler (Editor) "Festschrift for Wilhelm Jerusalem to his 60th Birthday" including essays of Max Adler, Rudolf Eisler, Sigmund Feilbogen, Rudolf Goldscheid, Stefan Hock, Helen Keller, Josef Kraus, Anton Lampa, Ernst Mach, Rosa Mayreder, Julius Ofner, Josef Popper, Otto Simon, Christine Touaillon and Anton Wildgans 1915
 Moritz Schlick "To the Memory of Wilhelm Jerusalem" Typoscript 1928 (Noord-Hollands Archief Harlem/NL - 017/A.63)
 William James "Pragmatism" edited by Klaus Oehler, 1994
 Heinz Weiss "The Teachers of the 'Schönbrunner Kreis'" 2007
 Herbert Gantschacher VIKTOR ULLMANN WITNESS AND VICTIM OF THE APOCALYPSE - ZEUGE UND OPFER DER APOKALYPSE - Testimone e vittima dell'Apocalisse - Prič in žrtev apokalipse - Svědek a oběť apokalypsy - Complete original edition in English and German with summaries in Italian, Slovenian and Czech language, ARBOS-Edition, Arnoldstein-Klagenfurt-Salzburg-Vienna-Prora-Prague 2015.
 Herbert Gantschacher Viktor Ullmann - Svědek a oběť apokalypsy 1914–1944. Archiv hlavního města Prahy, 2015, .

External links 

 Philos Website at www.philos-website.de (in German)
 http://www.phil.muni.cz/fil/scf/komplet/jerusa.html phil.muni.cz] (in Czech)

1854 births
1923 deaths
People from Chrudim District
Austrian philosophers
Austrian Jews
Czech Jews
Philosophers of Judaism
Burials at Döbling Cemetery